William Busac (1020–1076), son of William I, Count of Eu, and his wife Lesceline, was Count of Eu and Count of Soissons, de jure uxoris.  William was given the nickname Busac by the medieval chronicler Robert of Torigni.

William appealed to King Henry I of France, who gave him in marriage Adelaide, the heiress of the county of Soissons. Adelaide was daughter of Renaud I, Count of Soissons and Grand Master of the Hotel de France. William then became Count of Soissons in right of his wife. William and Adelaide had four children:
 Renaud II, Count of Soissons (died 1099)
 John I, Count of Soissons (died after 1115), married to Aveline de Pierrefonds
 Manasses of Soissons, Bishop of Cambrai, Bishop of Soissons (died 1 Mar 1108)
 Lithuise de Blois, married to Milo I of Montlhéry
 Raintrude, married to Raoul I of Nesle, a member of the House of Nesle.

His son Renaud became Count of Soissons upon William's death, and he was succeeded by his brother John.

References

Sources 

Counts of Eu
11th-century English nobility
1020 births
1076 deaths